Ikeda: Um Século de Humanismo, or simply Ikeda, is a biographical book written by Brazilian author Sophia Mendonça. The work features the intellectual trajectory of the Japanese philosopher and Buddhist leader Daisaku Ikeda. Ikeda was released on February 6, 2020.

Book's Overview 
The book arose from the author's desire to explore a new point of view, beyond the autistic universe. So, Ikeda is consistent with the biographer's ideas that none of us can exist in isolation, because we all receive support, influence and cooperation from others. Thus, it argues that being able to recognize and appreciate these intangible bonds of mutual support is an important requirement for global citizenship.

Ikeda shows Sophia Mendonça's journalistic perspective on the trajectory of the philosopher, writer, educator and photographer Daisaku Ikeda, Buddhist leader and one of the active pacifist exponents. According to Mendonça, the figure of Daisaku Ikeda has always fascinated her, because from a very young age she considered him a vanguard man with concrete answers to human questions, under a solid argument. The book has a preface by journalist Vera Golik. Ikeda's narrative takes us on a journey through time, following the history of Nichiren Buddhism and Soka Gakkai, highlighting pertinent parallels with the production of the greatest thinkers of all times that the publication portrays. The book has a preface by award-winning journalist and writer Vera Golik, who, like Sophia Mendonça, is a disciple of Daisaku Ikeda.

In this way, the book presents a humanistic philosophical approach, based on peace, culture and education, in addition to the preservation of the environment.     The author argues in the book that, in addition to being a philosopher and religious leader, Daisaku Ikeda is a global figure whose conversations with great diplomats, thinkers, scientists and artists have given him academic recognition and an international profile. For Mendonça, Daisaku Ikeda is above all a defender of peace through dialogue. Then, Sophia Mendonça analyzes the way in which the protagonist seeks the humanity of all the people with whom he dialogues. In this sense, the book brings a plurality of characters such as Fidel Castro and Margaret Thatcher. So, the writer considers that although Daisaku Ikeda's speech has Buddhist references, the philosopher bets on this dialogue as a means to overcome dogmatism and fanaticism. Sophia Mendonça reflects that, throughout Ikeda, we see the protagonist dialogue on a level that surpasses sectarianism. Ikeda also addresses Japan in the 1930s, portraying the philosopher's youth amid the impacts of the Second World War, in addition to portraying the Sino-Japanese negotiations between the 1960s and 1970s. China and the Soviet Union, as well as the US Secretary of State.

References 

2020 non-fiction books
Brazilian non-fiction books
Books about philosophers
Soka Gakkai
Books by Sophia Mendonça